Juan Lembeye (1816 in Ferrol – 1889 in Culleredo) was a Spanish naturalist.

Lembeye was the author of Aves de la Isla de Cuba (1850), the only book of bird illustrations to be published in Cuba. Born in Galicia, Lembeye lived in Cuba from the 1830s to the 1860s, and became interested in birds while he was there.  The majority of the 38 drawings in Lembeye's book were copied from the royal octavo plates of John James Audubon; in some cases, he even copied the plants depicted in the background. Bee hummingbird was described in his book first time, Mellisuga helenae Gundlach

Lembeye discovered Cuban solitaire (Myadestes elisabeth) and yellow-headed warbler (Teretistris fernandinae), and is commemorated in the specific name of Cuban gnatcatcher, Polioptila lembeyei.  His colleagues included Juan Gundlach and Victor López Seoane.

1816 births
1889 deaths
Cuban ornithologists
Spanish ornithologists
Spanish naturalists